Life's Decay is a darkwave, folk, and industrial music group from France that features both French and English female vocals. Based in Paris, the project was born at the beginning of 2003. Until 2005, singer-songwriter Lyktwasst was alone in the center of the project; realizing everything, from the concept to the accomplishment. Since 2005, he has been working with Alea, a feminine singer and lyric writer. In 2008, she also started to work on the music with Lyktwasst by introducing classical acoustic instruments.

Discography

Music videos

External links
CD Baby
Billboard.com
Life's Decay Official website
Life's Decay label

References 

Musical groups established in 2003
French musical groups
Musical groups from Paris